20 Years of Jethro Tull (1988) is a video by Jethro Tull, also known as Jethro Tull: This Is the First 20 Years.  It consists of interviews with fans, frontman Ian Anderson, Terry Ellis and Chris Wright of Chrysalis Records, and John Gee of the Marquee Club, giving a rough chronology of the band, interspersed with clips from music videos and live performances.  Many of the live performances are culled from the Madison Square Garden performance during the 1978 Heavy Horses tour.

Track list 
 "Living in the Past"
 "To Be Sad Is a Mad Way to Be"
 "The Whistler" (music video)
 "Too Old to Rock 'N' Roll; Too Young to Die" (music video)
 "Teacher"
 "Thick as a Brick"
 "Songs from the Wood"
 "Aqualung"
 "Heavy Horses" (music video)
 "Lap of Luxury"
 "Said She Was a Dancer"
 "Budapest"
 "Steel Monkey" (music video)
 "Jump Start"

Certifications

See also 
 20 Years of Jethro Tull (boxed set)
 20 Years of Jethro Tull: Highlights (sampler)
 Living with the Past

External links 
 20 Years Of Jethro Tull  at Allmovie
 20 Years Of Jethro Tull at The Internet Movie Database.
 20 Years Of Jethro Tull at discogs.

Jethro Tull (band) video albums
1988 video albums
Live video albums
1988 live albums
Albums recorded at Madison Square Garden
Jethro Tull (band) live albums